Ormand is a surname. Notable people with the surname include:

Danny Ormand
Francis Ormand Jonathan Smith (1806–1876), American lawyer, legislator, telegraph pioneer, and financier
Roger Ormand

See also
Ormond (disambiguation)